The Ladies European Open was a women's professional golf tournament on the Ladies European Tour held in England and Germany. It was first played at The Belfry in 1984 and held annually in England until 1990 with the exception of 1986. The 1992 and 1993 tournaments were held near Munich in Bavaria and the last installment in 1996 was held at Hanbury Manor near London.

Winners

Source:

References

External links
Ladies European Tour

Former Ladies European Tour events
Golf tournaments in England
Golf tournaments in Germany
Defunct sports competitions in England
Defunct sports competitions in Germany
Recurring sporting events established in 1984
Recurring sporting events disestablished in 1996